Laura Amy Schlitz is an American author of children's literature. She is a librarian and storyteller at the Park School of Baltimore in Brooklandville, Maryland.

She received the 2008 Newbery Medal for her children's book entitled Good Masters! Sweet Ladies! Voices from a Medieval Village, and the 2013 Newbery Honor for her children's book, Splendors and Glooms. She also won the 2016 Scott O'Dell Award for Historical Fiction, the 2015 National Jewish Book Award, and the Sydney Taylor Book Award for her young adult book, The Hired Girl. Her other published books are The Hero Schliemann: The Dreamer Who Dug For Troy (2006), A Drowned Maiden's Hair: A Melodrama (2006), which won a Cybils Award that year, The Bearskinner: A Tale of the Brothers Grimm (2007), The Night Fairy (2010), Princess Cora and the Crocodile (2017), and Amber and Clay (2021).

Schlitz attended Goucher College in Towson, Maryland, and graduated in 1977.

Good Masters! Sweet Ladies!

Good Masters! Sweet Ladies! Voices from a Medieval Village comprises more than twenty one-person plays and two two-person plays. The 10- to 15-year-old characters all live in or near a 13th-century English manor.

The monologues were written for the 5th Grade curriculum at The Park School during an F. Parvin Sharpless Faculty and Curricular Advancement Program (FACA) at the school.

The book was awarded the 2008 Newbery Medal for excellence in children's literature.

Splendors and Glooms 
The main character, rich girl Clara Wintermute, lives with her parents in a wealthy section of London. Her greatest wish for her birthday is for the puppet troupe she saw in a park one day to perform for her and her party guests. So the puppet master, Grisini, and his assistants, 14-year-old Lizzie Rose Fawr and 12-year-old Parsefall Hooke, visit the Wintermute home and put on their show. Then, not long after they visit, young Clara goes missing. Alleged kidnappers demand ransom from her parents, and Clara's father, Dr. Wintermute, brings the ransom to the appointed place, but the kidnapper never shows up. Meanwhile, an old witch is using her magic to summon Grisini to her estate near Lake Windermere. All of the children's lives soon become entangled with Grisini; the witch, Cassandra; and the Wintermutes. And all the while, Clara is being hidden in plain sight.

The book was awarded the 2013 Newbery Honor for excellence in children's literature.

List of published books

Candlewick Press published all eight books that are listed under Schlitz's name in the U.S. Library of Congress catalog.

 A Drowned Maiden's Hair: A Melodrama (2006), Cybils Award winner
 The Hero Schliemann: the dreamer who dug for Troy (2006), (illustrated by Robert Byrd)
 The Bearskinner: a tale of the Brothers Grimm (2007), retold by Schlitz, (illustrated by Max Grafe)
 Good Masters! Sweet Ladies! Voices from a Medieval Village (2007), Newbery Medal Winner (illustrated by Robert Byrd)
 The Night Fairy (2010), (illustrated by Angela Barrett)
 Splendors and Glooms (2012), Newbery Honor winner
 The Hired Girl (2015), Scott O'Dell Award for Historical Fiction, Sydney Taylor Book Award, and National Jewish Book Award winner 
 Princess Cora and the Crocodile (2017), (illustrated by Brian Floca)
 Amber and Clay (2021), (illustrated by Julia Iredale)

Schlitz also wrote A Gypsy at Almack's, an adult romance novel, under the name of Chloe Cheshire.

References

External links

Park School article about 2013 Newbery Honor
Miss Erin's 2007 interview with Schlitz

 

1955 births
Living people
American children's writers
Newbery Medal winners
Newbery Honor winners
Writers from Baltimore
American librarians
American women librarians
Goucher College alumni
People from Baltimore County, Maryland
21st-century American novelists
21st-century American women writers
American women children's writers
American women novelists
Novelists from Maryland